Janji is a socially conscious running clothing company dedicated to fighting the global water crisis. Based in Boston, Janji sells apparel with designs representing Haiti, Rwanda, Peru, Tanzania, the U.S. and Kenya, the countries in which Janji has ongoing efforts. Part of the profit from each sale goes toward charities based in that country. "Janji" means "promise" in Malay, and refers to Janji's promise to "run for another," the company's slogan.

History

Janji was founded by students on the cross country team at Washington University in St. Louis. While traveling to the 2010 NCAA Division III Track & Field Championships, David Spandorfer and Michael Burnstein came up with the idea of a creating a running clothes company that gives back. After gaining David Hamm as head designer and Ken Fairleigh to lead the Operations team, the group turned Janji into a legitimate and growing company over the next two years.

In 2011, the group won the top prize in the Youthbridge Social Enterprise and Innovation Competition (SEIC) at Washington University, earning Janji $15,000 for their efforts. In October of that same year, the group earned their company $20,000 in start-up money when they took another first in the UCCS Sports/Outdoors Business Plan Competition.

In May 2012, Janji launched their product line at Big River Running, a specialty running store in St. Louis, Missouri. Their first line of clothing sponsored two countries, Kenya and Haiti. Over the course of the summer of 2012, Janji slowly released in multiple running stores around the country. As of June 19, 2012, product orders had been placed by 92 specialty running stores in 28 states around the country.

The original name of the business was "Edele." They changed the name, co-founder David Spandorfer said, because people could not figure out how to pronounce "Edele" and often confused the name with Adele. "Janji," its current and permanent name, means "promise" in Malay.

Product Lines

Janji's first product line released shirts and shorts designed based on the flags of Haiti and Kenya. They featured two shirts and two pairs of shorts for each gender in four sizes. The women's pair of Run for Haiti shorts features the country's national colors and bird.

Currently, the company features short and long sleeved tops, shorts, tights, pants, and accessories like headbands and hats for both women and men, representing six countries (Haiti, Rwanda, Peru, Tanzania, U.S., Kenya)

Charities

Janji works with partner organizations based in the countries they sponsor. Part of the proceeds from each sale goes toward a direct donation to a charity organization.

In Haiti, Janji works with water.org, a non-profit dedicated to bringing clean water and aid to regions of developing countries. Through the partnership, the community of Bayas received a clean water pump in order to prevent further outbreaks of cholera from unfiltered water. Each piece of Haiti-themed apparel purchased provides one year of water to a person in Haiti.

Janji also works alongside water.org in Kenya, where 17.5 million people lack access to proper sanitation. Now, 32% of the population have access to improved sanitation through water.org's WaterCredit initiatives that provide safe water access to schools and households. Each piece of Kenya-themed apparel purchased provides one year of water to an individual or an organization in Kenya.

In Peru, Janji works with Living Water International to bring clean water access in order to lower mortality rates from hepatitis and diarrhea, which are water-bourne diseases from the Amazon River. Roughly 35% of rural Peruvians lack access to clean water and the infant mortality rate is near 15%. Because of Living Water International and Janji's efforts, a number of remote tribes now have access to clean drinking water. Each piece of Peru-themed apparel purchased provides four months of clean water to a family there.

Living Water Rwanda partners with Janji in Rwanda in order to provide more locally accessible clean water. Women in Rwanda walk roughly 7 miles or 20 hours a week in order to fetch water that is unsanitary. Living Water Rwanda has completed over 395 projects in the country. Each piece of Rwanda-themed apparel purchased provides clean water for a year to a Rwandan.

In Tanzania, Janji and MSABI partner together to create access to sanitation and clean water. Over half of the diseases that affect the population are the result of unsafe drinking water, and in rural areas, 420,000 people lack this access. MSABI also provides educational programs that have reached over 350,000 Tanzanians. Each piece of Janji's Tanzanian-themed outerwear provides three years of clean water access to a person in Tanzania; all other apparel provides one year of access.

Janji also wants to tackle the problem at home as well as abroad. In the United States, the Navajo population is 67% more likely than other Americans to live without running water or a toilet, and 40% of the Navajo population in New Mexico live without these amenities. DIGDEEP Right to Water Project (http://www.digdeep.org/) has brought clean sanitation access to over 250 American homes and through Janji, one piece of USA apparel provides a week of clean water to an American family.

In an interview with a local newspaper in Brookline, Massachusetts, Michael Burnstein, co-founder, emphasized that Janji looks for organizations that provide "innovative" and "proven" solutions to the global water crisis, ones that, "attack the problem at the root,"  highlighting water.org's, Living Water International's, DIGDEEP's and MSABI's partnerships.

References

Sporting goods manufacturers of the United States
American companies established in 2012
Manufacturing companies based in Boston